James E. Keller (August 13, 1942 – June 2, 2014) was an American judge born in Harlan, Kentucky, whose judicial career was centered in Lexington, Kentucky. He received his undergraduate degree from Eastern Kentucky University. In 1966, he graduated from the University of Kentucky College of Law before entering into private practice from 1969 until 1976.

He was elected to serve as a circuit court judge in Fayette County where he served as chief judge for more than twenty years. In 1999, Keller was appointed to the Kentucky Supreme Court.  He retained the seat in a subsequent election.

A 2005 inductee to the University of Kentucky College of Law Hall of Fame, Justice Keller retired from the Court in 2006.

In 2006, he again ran for elected office as a Democrat against State Senator Alice Forgy Kerr.  Justice Keller garnered 43.4% of the vote against the incumbent. He died of cancer in 2014.

References

1942 births
2014 deaths
People from Harlan, Kentucky
Kentucky Democrats
Kentucky state court judges
Justices of the Kentucky Supreme Court
Eastern Kentucky University alumni
University of Kentucky College of Law alumni
20th-century American judges